Redwing (or Red Wing) is an unincorporated community in Cheyenne Township, Barton County, Kansas, United States.

History
A post office operated in Redwing from 1892 to 1955.  There was a grain elevator and tavern in years past.

Geography

References

Further reading

External links
 Barton County maps: Current, Historic, KDOT

Unincorporated communities in Kansas
Unincorporated communities in Barton County, Kansas